Chimi Dorji (born 22 December 1993) is a Bhutanese international footballer, currently playing for Transport United FC. He made his first appearance for the Bhutan national football team in 2009.

References

1993 births
Bhutanese footballers
Bhutan international footballers
Living people
People from Sarpang District
Association football defenders
South Asian Games silver medalists for Bhutan
South Asian Games medalists in football